Simon Vella (born 19 September 1979) is a retired footballer who represented the Malta national team as a defender. Born in England, Vella started his career with Wimbledon before joining non-League Sutton United. He spent the rest of his club career in Scotland, playing for Stenhousemuir, Clydebank, Airdrie United, Forfar Athletic and in junior football for Bo'ness United. He joined Forfar in July 2003 after leaving Airdrie.

References

1979 births
Living people
People with acquired Maltese citizenship
Maltese footballers
Malta international footballers
English footballers
English people of Maltese descent
Association football defenders
Wimbledon F.C. players
Sutton United F.C. players
Stenhousemuir F.C. players
Clydebank F.C. (1965) players
Airdrieonians F.C. players
Forfar Athletic F.C. players
Bo'ness United F.C. players
Scottish Football League players
Scottish Junior Football Association players